Relational developmental systems (RDS) is a developmental psychological metatheory and conceptual framework. It is an extension of developmental systems theory that is based on the view that relationism is a superior alternative to Cartesian mechanism. RDS is the leading framework in modern developmental science. According to RDS metatheory, interactions between individuals and their environments, rather than either entity acting separately, are the cause of all aspects of human development. The term "relational developmental systems paradigm" has been used to refer to the combination of the RDS metatheory and the relationist worldview. The RDS framework is also fundamentally distinct from that of quantitative behavioral genetics, in that the former focuses on the causes of individual development, while the latter focuses on individual differences. RDS theorists reject the dichotomies associated with Cartesian dualism, such as those between nature and nurture, and between basic and applied science.

References

Metatheory
Psychological theories
Developmental psychology
Systems theory